David James Poulin (born December 17, 1958) is a Canadian former professional ice hockey centre who played 13 seasons in the National Hockey League (NHL) with the Philadelphia Flyers, Boston Bruins and Washington Capitals.

Playing career
Poulin went undrafted in the NHL Entry Draft and played with the Notre Dame Fighting Irish at the University of Notre Dame from 1978–1982. He was named to the Second All-Star Team in 1982. Following his NCAA career, he moved to Sweden to play for Rögle BK. Poulin's head coach was Ted Sator, who was also a scout for the Philadelphia Flyers in the National Hockey League. Sator was impressed with Poulin's abilities and called for him to be put on board the Flyers' roster.

Philadelphia Flyers
In 1982–83, Poulin made the leap to the NHL after a brief stint with the Maine Mariners of the American Hockey League. On the second-last day of the season, Poulin made his debut at Maple Leaf Gardens, scoring two goals in a 6-3 Philadelphia victory.

The following season, Poulin was put on a line with Brian Propp and Tim Kerr. The line became a dangerous offensive line in the league for the bulk of the next three seasons, and in his first full NHL campaign, helped him set a club record (now since passed) for most points by a Flyers rookie with 76. Poulin quickly established himself as a strong leader and a player that could play at both ends of the ice, owing to the fact that he was 25 years old before taking a regular shift in the NHL. Those attributes aided in his being named team captain on the eve of the 1984–85 season, replacing Hall of Famer Bobby Clarke, who had dealt former teammate Darryl Sittler to the Detroit Red Wings on the day he was to take the captaincy.

Poulin continued to be a strong presence offensively and defensively during his eight-year stay in Philadelphia, and overcame debilitating injuries at key times to help the club win. In 1985, though slowed by knee and rib injuries, he helped a young Flyers club reach the 1985 Stanley Cup Finals, where they lost to the Edmonton Oilers in five games. During Game 6 of the Wales Conference Finals at the Spectrum, Poulin scored a memorable two-man disadvantage short-handed goal which helped close out the Quebec Nordiques. Two years later, Poulin missed chunks of playoff time with fractured ribs, but contributed to a pair of series clinchers—a 5–1 win over the New York Islanders in Game 7 of the Patrick Division Finals, and in Game 6 of the Wales Finals at the Montreal Forum. Once healthy, he could not aid Philly in the 1987 Stanley Cup Finals, as the Flyers lost to Edmonton again, but this time in a seven-game thriller. For his efforts during the regular season, he was awarded the Frank J. Selke Trophy in 1986–87 and was named to the 1986 and 1988 NHL All-Star Games. Poulin also played at the Rendez-vous '87 event where he recorded the winner late in the third period of Game 1.

The switch from Mike Keenan to Paul Holmgren as Flyers head coach meant a shift in responsibilities, as Poulin became more of a defensive specialist. By 1989–90, Poulin's play was deteriorating due to injuries and inconsistent play of his teammates, and less than a month after being stripped of the captaincy, was traded to the Boston Bruins for former Flyers centre Ken Linseman.

Boston Bruins
In his first season with the Bruins, Poulin, along with former teammate Brian Propp, made it all the way to the Stanley Cup Final against the Edmonton Oilers, but Boston lost in five games. He stayed with the team for three more years which saw him win the King Clancy Memorial Trophy and finish as runner-up for the Frank J. Selke Trophy in 1992–93. He left the team as a free agent following the 1992–93 season and signed on with the Washington Capitals. Poulin lasted another season-and-a-half before retiring from professional play.

Post-playing career
Poulin spent 10 years as head hockey coach at his alma mater, the University of Notre Dame. In 2004, Poulin was inducted into the Flyers Hall of Fame. On July 23, 2009, Toronto Maple Leafs GM Brian Burke introduced Poulin as the club's new Vice-President of Hockey Operations. In January 2013, Poulin began serving as the GM of the Toronto Marlies.

On July 22, 2014, the Maple Leafs announced that they had fired Poulin. He has since joined TSN as a hockey analyst on radio and TV.
He is also a freelance contributor to the Toronto Star newspaper.

Awards and honours

 Inducted into the Flyers Hall of Fame on February 23, 2004.

Career statistics

Regular season and playoffs

All-Star Games

Head coaching record

References

 Meltzer, Bill Flyers Heroes of the Past: Dave Poulin at PhiladelphiaFlyers.com

External links
 

1958 births
Anaheim Ducks scouts
Boston Bruins players
Canadian ice hockey centres
Franco-Ontarian people
Frank Selke Trophy winners
Ice hockey people from Ontario
King Clancy Memorial Trophy winners
Living people
Maine Mariners players
National Hockey League All-Stars
Notre Dame Fighting Irish ice hockey coaches
Notre Dame Fighting Irish men's ice hockey players
Philadelphia Flyers captains
Philadelphia Flyers players
Rögle BK players
Sportspeople from Timmins
Toronto Maple Leafs executives
Undrafted National Hockey League players
Washington Capitals players
Canadian expatriate ice hockey players in Sweden